Wattpad is an online literature platform intended for users to read and write original stories. The founders Allen Lau and Ivan Yuen say that the platform aims to create social communities around stories and remove the barriers between readers and writers. The platform allows users to write and publish stories, or read stories written by other users. In January 2021, Naver Corporation announced that it would be acquiring Wattpad; the deal was completed in May 2021. As of November 2021, Wattpad has a monthly audience of more than 90 million users, who can directly interact with the writers and share their opinions with fellow readers.

Wattpad has stories available in more than 50 languages, and nearly 300,000 writers from 35 countries take part every year in the largest writing competition, The Watty Awards. Some of these stories have been transformed into TV dramas and movies; examples include After and The Kissing Booth. In January 2019, Wattpad launched a publishing division named Wattpad Books in an effort to take the "guesswork" out of publishing for authors.

History and founder 
Wattpad was developed in 2006, as the result of a collaboration between Allen Lau and Ivan Yuen. The company is based in Toronto, Ontario.

Growth and funding
In February 2007, Wattpad had announced the addition of over 17,000 e-books from Project Gutenberg making them available to mobile users. According to a June 2009 Wattpad press release, the application had been downloaded over 5 million times. In March 2009, an iPhone version was released. This was followed by the launch on BlackBerry App World in April 2009, Google Android in June 2009 and Apple iPad in April 2010. In December 2015, Windows Phone 8.1 and Windows 10 Mobile Version was released. Currently, Wattpad has more than 90 million users who collectively spend 15 billion minutes each month using Wattpad. As of 2018, there are more than 400 million fanfiction uploads on Wattpad.

As of January 2018, Wattpad had received almost USD $117.8M in funding from investors. In 2011, Wattpad announced that it received $3.5M in total funding from its current investors, and from W Media Ventures, Golden Venture Partners, and Union Square Ventures. Then in June 2012, Wattpad raised $17.3M from a group of venture funds led by Khosla Ventures.

In April 2014, Wattpad announced $46M in the Series C funding led by OMERS ventures. In January 2018, Wattpad announced USD $51M in funding from Tencent Holdings Limited, BDC, Globe Telecom's Kickstart Ventures, Peterson Group, Canso, and existing investor Raine.

Awards 
In December 2011, Toronto-based Wattpad was selected as the hottest Digital Media company in the country at the Canadian Innovation Exchange. In the same year, co-founder and CEO Ivan Yuen was also recognized as a top Canadian entrepreneur at the Impact Infused Awards, sponsored by Deloitte.

In the Philippines

Wattpad's most followed author worldwide, Jonaxx, hailed as the "Wattpad Queen" and "Pop Fiction Queen", is from the Philippines.
 

In March 2014, Wattpad signed a contract with Pop Fiction, an imprint of Summit Media, to print Filipino Wattpad stories in the Philippines. Other publishers from the Philippines also publish stories from Wattpad.

Since then, some Wattpad stories have also been adapted into teleseries. Filipino television network TV5, in partnership with Wattpad and Life is Beautiful Publishing Company launched Wattpad Presents, a series of Wattpad stories turned into TV dramas. Wattpad stories aired on the show are usually those that were published by LIB Publishing.

ABS-CBN also made several adaptations of Wattpad stories such as "My App Boyfie" by Noreen Capili (noringai), starring James Reid and Nadine Lustre, and the coming-of-age series Bagito starring Nash Aguas, Alexa Ilacad and Ella Cruz. Pop Fiction's best-selling book, She's Dating the Gangster, written by Bianca Bernardino (SGWannaB) as a Wattpad original, became the first Wattpad story adapted into a full-length motion picture starring Kathryn Bernardo and Daniel Padilla. The movie adaptation was produced by ABS-CBN's film production arm, Star Cinema. Liza Soberano and Enrique Gil also starred on the film Just The Way You Are, based on the Wattpad story "The Bet" by Ilurvbooks. "Chasing Red" was published by isabelleronin, a Filipino-Canadian writer which got more than 200 million views. In 2021, He's Into Her, a novel written by Maxinejiji (Maxine Lat Calibuso), will premiere on iWant TFC, starring Belle Mariano and Donny Pangilinan.

GMA Network has also started making adaptations of Wattpad stories via Luv Is, a series of stories turned into dramas similar to that of TV5 but the stories are longer.

Sister Apps 
In February 2015 Wattpad launched a second standalone app called "After Dark". The app focuses specifically on the romance genre and is intended for adult readers.

On February 21, 2017, Wattpad launched a chat stories app called Tap, which offers stories in the form of text messages as if reading a private conversation on someone else's phone. The app was an early success, with over 240 million taps in the first few weeks after the launch. On July 28, 2017, Tap launched 'Tap Originals', a series of original stories produced by writers every week, with some of these series working on an episode-by-episode basis.

Paid stories 
On November 13, 2018, Wattpad introduced "Next Beta" to a few select countries for early testing. The launch of the Next Beta featured more than fifty exclusively selected stories to be paid with Watt Coins, which could be earned by having readers spend coins  to unlock participating Next Beta stories. This offered writers the chance to earn money through their work and to provide support for readers. Wattpad planned a fast-follow launch for Next in Spanish-speaking regions and to expand the program. The program was available in Latin America and Spain beginning May 27, 2019, before expanding worldwide on July 11 the same year. On September 17, 2019, the Wattpad Team announced the ending of the Next Beta program after results from the program showed that "Wattpadders are ready for a program that funds writers". The program was later rebranded to "Paid Stories".

June 2020 data breach 
In June 2020, Wattpad suffered a huge data breach that exposed almost 270 million records. The data was initially sold before being published on a public hacking forum where it was widely circulated. The incident exposed extensive personal information including names and usernames, email and IP addresses, genders, birth dates and passwords stored as bcrypt hashes.

Later that same year on July 14, researchers at Risk Based Security discovered that a threat actor from an unknown source was responsible for the breach, along with the sourcing of over 278 million password credentials and email addresses, with breakdown analysis suggested that Gmail, Yahoo, and Outlook accounts were mostly affected. The Wattpad Corporation has since investigated and patched the issue.

Acquisition by Naver 
In January 2021, Wattpad announced that it was to be acquired by Naver Corporation in a $600 million cash-and-stock deal. In an interview, Lau states "it’s also been very clear from Naver, and we agree, that we should operate as independently as possible." Wattpad will remain headquartered in Canada and under its current leadership.

Usage

Statistics 
As of September 2020:
 More than 85% of its traffic and usage comes from mobile devices,
 The site has 90 million monthly users,
 There are over 665 million story uploads in total,
 80% of users are female, 80% of whom are millennials or Gen Z.

New authors and teens 
The most frequently voted stories appear on the "What's Hot List". According to the profiles visible on the site, many of these authors are teenagers.

Wattpad section also has a Featured Story list, which promotes content reviewed and approved by staff and an editorial review board. Many of these featured stories are written by self-published and professional writers from different genres. Famous authors like Margaret Atwood, Paulo Coelho and R. L. Stine have also joined Wattpad. Wattpad also encourages the writers to interact with their audience and promote their stories across social media websites like Twitter, Facebook, YouTube and Instagram.

Fan fiction

Wattpad has increased in popularity among many fandoms, who take to the platform to craft their own fan fiction. One of the most notable stories on the platform is the After series by Anna Todd, which was originally published as a Harry Styles fan fiction. After its large popularity amongst the One Direction fandom and the app's readers, the story became the most read book on Wattpad, having achieved just under 10 million unique readers on the platform and been read more than one billion times. The series went on to be published by Gallery Books and became a New York Times Best Seller.

By crafting a spot for fanfiction alongside its other genres, Wattpad prioritizes its teen readers and gives the platform a twist.  Deputy General Manager, Ashleigh Gardner, added the following about the genre: "What’s unique about Wattpad is that fanfic is treated like any other genre, living alongside other forms of fiction. This makes it more fluid for readers of an original fiction to discover a new fanfic, or inspire a fanfiction writer to start a new story and bring their audience along with them."

Fan fiction is the third-largest category on Wattpad, closely behind Romance and Teen Fiction, many of which are also fan fictions.

Contests 
Wattpad hosts a number of writing contests each year, including the annual Watty Awards, the largest writing competition in the world. In 2011, The Watty Awards introduced three entry levels (Popular, On The Rise, and Undiscovered) to allow greater chances of winning for every type of writer. Contests are open to anyone who has a Wattpad account.

During the summer of 2012, Wattpad in collaboration with Margaret Atwood, Canadian poet/novelist/literary critic, held the "Wattys": the first major poetry contest offering a chance to poets on Wattpad to compete against each other in one of two categories, either as an "Enthusiast" or a "Competitor". It has been going ever since, and now the contest is open to books of all genres.

Publishing 
Wattpad has formed ties with publishing houses to try to help Wattpad authors to receive compensation for their works. A new branch, Wattpad Studios, was developed to connect popular writers to both the publishing and film industries. Wattpad has, in the past, teamed up with publishing groups such as Sourcebooks to help Wattpad authors receive book deals, and get their work into hard copies. More traditional publishing houses such as Random House and HarperCollins have approached popular Wattpad writers to negotiate publishing deals, allowing the website to serve as a springboard into the more traditional publishing industry.

Author Anna Todd, whose work "After" has received over a billion reads on the site, was given a publishing deal with Simon & Schuster to turn her online work into a multiple-book published saga. A film version starring Josephine Langford, Hero Fiennes Tiffin, Selma Blair, Jennifer Beals, Peter Gallagher, and Shane Paul McGhie was released by Aviron Pictured on April 12, 2019.

Wattpad Books 
On January 24, 2019, Wattpad launched publishing division Wattpad Books led by Wattpad Studios' Publishing Deputy Manager Ashleigh Gardner, with operations managed by Wattpad Studios' Publishing Director Deanna McFadden. According to CEO Allen Lau, this project was in an effort to take the "guesswork" out of publishing.

Wattpad Books acquisitions uses a mix of their Story DNA Machine Learning technology (algorithms) learning with human editors. This human-and-digital acquisitions team look to Wattpad's large and existing digital library (over half a billion titles) in order to select notable material for publication. According to Wattpad Books leader Ashleigh Gardner, this is in an effort to combat bias inherent in human editors. Gardner says that this technology analyses the data behind each title, looking at story structure and word use in addition to levels of reader engagement per title. This data is then compared to analyses of other books on Wattpad and in the public domain. Once all the data has been collected and engagement has been looked at, human staffers read the titles and create their list.

All published titles are an amalgamation of international hits and notable but known material from their digital library. These titles are distributed by Macmillan in the United States of America, Raincoast Books in Canada, and Penguin Random House in India and the United Kingdom, with their Fall 2019 list available in leading North American retailers. Outside North America, Gardner has sold the rights to Hachette (France) for Deanna Cameron’s What Happened Last Night. Additionally, Lauren Palphreyman's rights to Cupid's Match have been sold in French (Hachette) and German (S. Fischer Verlgage).

Wattpad's first list consists of six young adult novels. The QB Bad Boy & Me by Tay Marley (28.8 million reads) will be their lead title and was slated for release on August 13, 2019. The remaining five books will be released between September and October 2019 and include: Trapeze by Leigh Ansell (2.5 million reads), What Happened That Night by Deanna Cameron (over 1 million reads), Saving Everest by Sky Reads (17.2 million reads), Cupid's Match by Lauren Palphreyman (46.4 million reads), and I'm a Gay Wizard by V.S. Santoni (404,000 reads). Wattpad hopes to publish 18 titles in their 2020 list.

Besides Wattpad Books, Wattpad announced partnership with Anvil Publishing, Inc., one of the Philippines' leading publishers, to create Bliss Books, a YA imprint with Filipino Young Adult and romance fanatics as their target market.

Entertainment 
Netflix film The Kissing Booth was written in 2011 by author Beth Reekles. It originated as a story on Wattpad where it won a Watty Award for "Most Popular Teen Fiction" in Wattpad's annual writing contest. By 2012 it had amassed over 19 million reads on Wattpad and, in 2013, was published by Penguin Random House. In an interview with Forbes, Reekles explains what drew her to Wattpad: "I loved the feeling of community on the site, and when I began to share, I liked the anonymity of it because I was so self-conscious about my writing and hadn't shared it with anyone before."

Since The Kissing Booth premiered on Netflix on May 11, 2018, Ted Sarandos called it "one of the most-watched movies in the country, and maybe in the world". The Kissing Booth was the fourth most-popular movie in IMDb's popularity rankings in June 2018. Wattpad has also signed deals with Asian distribution partners, such as pan-Asian streaming platform Iflix to co-produce dozens of original movies based on Wattpad stories out of Indonesia, and Singapore's Mediacorp, to bring Wattpad stories to Mediacorp's FTA channels such as Channel 5 (with exception of CNA) and its streaming service Toggle.

On December 8, 2021, it was announced that ViacomCBS would be partnering with Wattpad to produce some of its original stories.

Wattpad, with AwesomenessTV, produces Hulu's popular Light as a Feather.

Effects on writers 
According to a study, online writing communities like Wattpad help young writers learn and grow their craft from constructive feedback and criticism. Composed of students and their experiences on online writing platforms, the study aims to show how constructive criticism affects their writing process. Most participants prefer serious feedback over subtle critiquing, based on the results.

Wattpad as well as similar online writing communities help young authors build and construct their self perception as writers, as well as establishes an audience and interact with readers. It acts as a gateway into the publishing realm and offers hands-on experience with digital writing. This type of experience helps writers develop personal authorship.

Wattpad offers unique features that other writing platforms do not, such as the interactive margin commenting. Registered readers can add comments and feedback by individual lines and paragraphs as they are reading rather than after the chapter or story is finished. These comment sections are available to be viewed by all readers (guests and non-guests alike, so far as of 2021). Registered users can also use them for reacting to the chapter, offering feedback, or just for personal input, allowing readers to see what others are thinking and writers to see how readers are responding. If a guest attempts to view replies to a comment, or wishes to give feedback themselves, they will be prompted to create an account or log in to do so.

Copyright issues 
Early in its history, some of the large volumes of user-uploaded material hosted on Wattpad was copyrighted material created by authors who did not grant republication rights. In May 2009, an article in The New York Times noted, "Sites like Scribd and Wattpad, which invite users to upload documents like college theses and self-published novels, have been the target of industry grumbling in recent weeks, as illegal reproductions of popular titles have turned up on them".

The Wattpad website notes, "We do not welcome upload of material that violates its copyright terms," but also states "it is simply not possible to screen and verify all posted content." In response to industry criticism, in April 2009 (before the publication of the New York Times article that named Wattpad as a vehicle for user-generated e-book infringement) Wattpad announced an "Authors In Charge" program, designed to allow authors or their representatives to identify and directly remove infringing content from the site, but this program is designed specifically for "authors with published books for sale." Authors may begin their stories on Wattpad and then choose to publish their work. In most cases, the work on Wattpad is only a sample to ensure funds going to them in regard to their writing.

Competitors and similar sites
Bookmate and the long-established and popular sites FanFiction.Net and Fiction Press (a spin-off site for original fiction) also serve as hubs for online prose. An alternative site which is free and open source is Archive of Our Own, or AO3.

Explanatory notes

References 

 
2006 establishments in Ontario
2021 mergers and acquisitions
Android (operating system) software
BlackBerry software
Canadian companies established in 2006
Canadian publishers (people)
Canadian subsidiaries of foreign companies
Companies based in Toronto
Ebook sources
Ebook suppliers
Electronic paper technology
Fan fiction
Internet properties established in 2006
IOS software
Naver Corporation
Online companies of Canada
Online publishing companies
Self-publishing companies
Universal Windows Platform apps